Menemerus pilosus is a jumping spider species in the genus Menemerus that lives in Namibia. The male was first described by Wanda Wesołowska in 1999.

References

Spiders described in 1999
Fauna of Namibia
Salticidae
Spiders of Africa
Taxa named by Wanda Wesołowska